Zubovo is a village in the municipality of Novo Selo, North Macedonia.

Demographics
According to the 2002 census, the village had a total of 648 inhabitants. Ethnic groups in the village include:

Macedonians 646
Others 2

References

Villages in Novo Selo Municipality